Funar is a suco in the northwest of Laclubar subdistrict (Manatuto District, East Timor). It has 1790 inhabitants (census 2010) and an area of 91.55 km2.

References

Populated places in Aileu District
Sucos of East Timor
Manatuto Municipality